Richard Hampton Vose (November 8, 1803 – January 19, 1864) was an American politician and the 14th Governor of Maine for two days in 1841.

Early life
Vose was born in Northfield, Massachusetts, on November 8, 1803, and was graduated from Bowdoin College in 1822.

Career
Vose served as a member of the Maine House of Representatives in 1824, 1835, 1838 and 1839. He was a member of the Maine State Senate from 1840 to 1841. In 1841, he was Senate President. John Fairfield, Governor of Maine at the time, resigned on January 12, 1841, after having been elected to the United States Senate to fill the term of Sen. Reuel Williams who had also resigned. As Senate President, Vose filled Fairfield's unexpired term. He served as Governor of Maine from January 12, 1841, to January 13, 1841. Edward Kent became the governor on January 13, 1841. He returned to his original position and finished his term. He was known for “his confiding nature and sanguine temperament”.

Death
He died on January 19, 1864.

Sources 
 Sobel, Robert and John Raimo. Biographical Directory of the Governors of the United States, 1789-1978. Greenwood Press, 1988. 

 “Richard H. Vose” Friends of the Blaine House at http://blainehouse.org/governors/Richard_H_Vose.htm

1803 births
1864 deaths
Governors of Maine
Bowdoin College alumni
Maine Whigs
Politicians from Augusta, Maine
Presidents of the Maine Senate
Maine lawyers
Whig Party state governors of the United States
19th-century American politicians
19th-century American lawyers